Lomaiviti is an East Fijian language spoken by about 1,600 people on a number of islands of Fiji.

References

East Fijian languages
Languages of Fiji
Lomaiviti Province